Heiltsuk , Haíłzaqvḷa, also known as Bella Bella and Haihais, is a dialect of the North Wakashan (Kwakiutlan) language Heiltsuk-Oowekyala that is spoken by the Haihai (Xai'xais) and Bella Bella First Nations peoples of the Central Coast region of the Canadian province of British Columbia, around the communities of Bella Bella and Klemtu, British Columbia. Bella Bella is the headquarters of the Heiltsuk Nation government.

Heiltsuk is spoken in the villages of Bella Bella and Klemtu, both located on coastal islands in British Columbia not far from Bella Coola and Ocean Falls. It is one of the four Northern Wakashan languages, the others being Haisla (spoken in Kitimaat), Oowekyala (in Rivers Inlet), and Kwakwala (in Alert Bay, Port Hardy, and various settlements).

Heiltsuk is considered to be a dialect of Heiltsuk-Oowekyala, which, like neighbouring Haisla and Kwak'wala, are part of the Northern Wakashan language group. Heiltsuk has both conversational and ceremonial forms.

Phonology

Consonants 
The following is a chart of the obstruents in Heiltsuk.

The resonants in intervocalic forms function similarly to vowels, and so will be charted below.

Vowels 
Heiltsuk has phonemic short, long, and glottalized vowels. There are mainly three vowel sounds in the Heiltsuk dialect noted as /i, u, a/, although nine other sounds are heard as allophones [ɨ, ɪ, ʊ, ɛ, ə, ɔ, æ, ʌ, ɑ].

Tone 
Vowels and intervocalic resonants [m n l] can take on either high or low tone. High tone is marked with an acute for vowels (/á í ú/), and with a dot underneath for resonants (/ṃ ṃ̓ ṇ ṇ̓ ḷ ḷ̓/). They can also be glottalized.

The velar and glottal resonants are sometimes preaspirated.

References

Bibliography

 Boas, Franz. (1928). Bella Bella texts. Columbia University contributions to anthropology (No. 5).
 Boas, Franz. (1932). Bella Bella tales. Memoirs of the American Folklore Society (No. 25).
 Howe, Darin M. (2000). Oowekyala segmental phonology. (Doctoral dissertation, University of Ottawa).
 Mithun, Marianne. (1999). The languages of Native North America. Cambridge: Cambridge University Press. 
 Poser, William J. (2003). The status of documentation for British Columbia native languages. Yinka Dene Language Institute Technical Report (No. 2). Vanderhoof, British Columbia: Yinka Dene Language Institute.
Rath, John C. (1974). On the Phonological Description of the Heiltsuk Language. Dutch Contributions to the 9th International Conference on Salish Languages.
 Rath, John C. (1981). A practical Heiltsuk-English dictionary with a grammatical introduction. Mercury Series paper, Canadian Ethnology Service, (No. 75). Vol. i & ii. Ottawa: National Museums of Canada.
 Windsor, Evelyn W. (1982). Oowekeeno oral traditions as told by the late chief Simon Walkus, Sr. Hilton, S.; & Rath, J. (Eds.). Mercury series (No. 84). Ottawa: National Museum of Man.

External links
 The Heiltsuk-Oweek'ala Language (YDLI)
 Bibliography of Materials on the Heiltsuk Language (YDLI)
 The Wakashan Languages
 Heiltsuk Nation Website
 Heiltsuk Tourism Website
 

+
Wakashan languages
Indigenous languages of the Pacific Northwest Coast
First Nations languages in Canada
Central Coast of British Columbia
Endangered Wakashan languages